The 2019 West Georgia Wolves football team represented the University of West Georgia as a member of the Gulf South Conference (GSC) during the 2019 NCAA Division II football season. They were led by third-year head coach David Dean. The Wolves played their home games at University Stadium in Carrollton, Georgia.

Looking to build on the successes of the 2018 campaign, West Georgia entered the 2019 season to place second in the conference behind Valdosta State. They finished the season with a record of 6–5 (4–4 in the GSC).

Previous season
The Wolves finished the 2018 season 10–2, 7–1 in Gulf South Conference (GSC) play, to finish second in the conference standings. The team lost in the first round of the NCAA Division II football playoffs against Wingate.

Schedule

Rankings

References

West Georgia
West Georgia Wolves football seasons
West Georgia Wolves football